Illiac Suite (later retitled String Quartet No. 4) is a 1957 composition for string quartet which is generally agreed to be the first score composed by an electronic computer. Lejaren Hiller, in collaboration with Leonard Isaacson, programmed the ILLIAC I computer at the University of Illinois at Urbana–Champaign (where both composers were professors) to generate compositional material for his String Quartet No. 4.

The piece consists of four movements, corresponding to four experiments: the first is about the generation of cantus firmi, the second generates four-voice segments with various rules, the third deals with rhythm, dynamics and playing instructions, and the fourth with various models and probabilities for generative grammars or Markov chains (see stochastic music).

References

External links 
 December 4, 2011. See also: 2/4, 3/4, and 4/4.

Compositions for string quartet
Computer music compositions
Suites (music)